Chinchahoma Creek is a stream in the U.S. state of Mississippi.

Chinchahoma Creek is a name derived from the Choctaw language. A variant name is "Chincka Homa Creek".

References

Rivers of Mississippi
Rivers of Oktibbeha County, Mississippi
Mississippi placenames of Native American origin